Frederick Mutebi Kitaka, sometimes referred to as Frederick Kitaka Mutebi, is a Ugandan physicist, mathematician, accountant, entrepreneur, and industrialist. He is the executive director of finance of Cipla Quality Chemical Industries Limited (CIPLAQCIL), a Ugandan limited liability company. CIPLAQCIL is the only Sub-Saharan pharmaceutical company that is licensed to manufacture triple therapy antiretroviral medication. He is also a shareholder in the company and sits on its board of directors.

Education
Kitaka was educated at St. Mary's College Kisubi, a boys-only boarding middle and high school located in Wakiso District in the Central Region of Uganda. He studied mathematics and physics at Makerere University, graduating with a Bachelor of Science degree. He also holds a Master of Business Administration in accounting and financial management from the University of Buckingham.

Work history
From 1994 until 2002, Kitaka worked as the financial controller at Coopers Uganda Limited, a company that later rebranded to MTK Holdings Limited. From 2002 until 2005, he worked as the director of finance at Quality Chemicals Limited. In 2005, he became the chief financial officer at Quality Chemical Industries Limited. He also sits on the board of Buganda Investments and Commercial Undertakings Limited

See also
Cipla
Emmanuel Katongole (businessman)
Francis Kitaka
George Baguma

References

External links
Cipla Quality Chemical Industries Limited

Living people
Ugandan accountants
Ganda people
Makerere University alumni
Alumni of the University of Buckingham
Chief financial officers
Ugandan Roman Catholics
Ugandan businesspeople
Year of birth missing (living people)